The Space Basis Act authorized the Interstate Commerce Commission to determine fair and reasonable rates of compensation to be paid, upon a space basis, for the transportation of mail and any service connected therewith.

1916 in American law
United States federal postal legislation